Fly High Butterfly is an upcoming South Korean television series directed by Kim Bo-kyung and Kim Da-ye. Starring Kim Hyang-gi, Oh Yoon-ah, Choi Daniel and Shim Eun-woo, the series follows the story of hair stylists at 'Fly on Butterfly' hair salon. It was scheduled to premiere on JTBC in 2022, but postponed.

Fly High Butterfly began airing the series ahead of its television release on July 15, 2022 in Taiwan via MyVideo and on August 1, 2022, titled as Salon de Nabi, on Amazon Prime Video in selected regions.

Synopsis
The series tells the story of the hair stylists and interns at hair salon named 'Fly Up Butterfly', who transform customers into 'butterfly'. The series follows: Kwang Soo, a hairstylist, hair salon director Michelle (Oh Yoon-ah), hairstylist Jen, interns Gi-Bbeum (Kim Hyang-gi), Moo Yeol, Teacher Woo, and Soo-ri. All work hard in tiring conditions, dealing with all kind of customers.

Cast
 Kim Hyang-gi as Gi-Bbeum
 Oh Yoon-ah as Michelle / Mi Sel, director of 'Fly Up Butterfly'
 Choi Daniel as Kwang Soo, hair designer
 Shim Eun-woo as Jen
 Park Jung-woo as Moo Yeol
 Moon Tae-yoo as Teacher Woo
 Kim Ga-hee as Soo-ri
 Yoo In-soo
 Lim Soo-jung
 Han Soo-ah as Han Su-a	
 Park So-jin

Production
On 4 June 2020, JWIDE Company announced that Choi Daniel was positively considering role in the television series. On 5 August, Oh Yoon-ah's agency announced that she was considering to appear in the drama.

On June 25, 2021, Oh Yoon-ah posted photos on her Instagram account and announced that it was last day of filming.

Release
Ahead of its release in South Korea, the series was released in Taiwan on Chunghwa Telecom's CHT MOD drama 199 zone on July 15, 2022 airing on weekends. From August 13, it began airing on the MOD353 channel of Longhua Idol Channel. Titled as Salon de Nabi, it was available from August 1, 2022 on Amazon Prime Video in selected regions, for streaming.

References

External links
 Fly High Butterfly at Daum 
 
 

JTBC television dramas
Korean-language television shows
2022 South Korean television series debuts
Television series by JTBC Studios
South Korean romance television series
South Korean workplace television series
Upcoming television series